Svend Nielsen (born 20 April 1937) is a modern Danish composer. He was a student of Vagn Holmboe, Finn Høffding and Per Nørgård. His inspirations are Nørgård, Ravel and Debussy.

Works
 Sinfonia concertante (1994) for cello solo and ensemble (20')
 Violinkoncert (1985) for violin and orchestra (25’)

Orchestral songs 
 Akustisk Regnbue ("Acoustic Rainbow," 2002) for alto voice and Concert Band (17') to text by Pia Tafdrup.
 Ekbátana (2006) for soprano and orchestra (15') to text by Sophus Claussen.
 Kammerkantate ("Chamber cantata," 1975) for soprano and ensemble (20’) to text by Jørgen Leth.
 Svinedrengen ("The Swineherd," 2003) for narrator, soprano and baritone, children's choir and orchestra (25') to text by H. C. Andersen.

Vocal
 Dreamsongs (1988) for soprano, alto flute, electric guitar and cello (12’)
 Opstigning mod Akseki (1979) for soprano, vibraphone or violin and guitar (8’)
 På bunden af min drøm (1993) for mezzo-soprano, clarinet, piano and cello (18') to text by Pia Tafdrup
 Ritorneller (1994) for soprano and 2 guitars (10’) to text by Emil Aarestrup (10’)
 Sommerfugledalen "Butterfly valley" (Part 1 1998 / Part 2 2004) for chamber choir (12 solo voices) (40’) to text by Inger Christensen
 Sonnetts of Time (1978) for soprano, flute, guitar, violin and cello (14’)
 Så stille (1986) for alto voice, alto flute, vibraphone, guitar and cello to text by Gustav Munch-Petersen

References

1937 births
Living people
Pupils of Vagn Holmboe
Pupils of Finn Høffding